Be-in Kyun, also known as Abhay Island, is a small island off the coast of Rakhine State, Burma.

Geography
Be-in Kyun is 1.1 km long and 0.35 km wide. The island is flat, rising to a maximum height of 4 m. It is located 1.2 km away from the mainland coast.

Nearby islands
There is a small bushy islet in the middle of the sound separating Be-in Kyun from the continental shore.

See also
List of islands of Burma

References 

Islands of Myanmar
Rakhine State